Kijang may refer to

 Kijang county, located between Haeundae-gu and Ulsan in northern Busan, South Korea
 Kijang (state constituency), a state constituency in Kelantan, Malaysia
 Kijang Emas, the official gold bullion coin of Malaysia
 Raja Haji Fisabilillah International Airport, an international airport located in Tanjungpinang, Riau Islands, Indonesia, formerly called Kijang Airport
 Toyota Kijang, an automobile model from Toyota